The 2013 Eurockey Cup U-15 was the 2nd edition of the Eurockey Cup U-15. It was held in November 2013 in Vilanova i la Geltrú, in Spain.

Teams

Group stage

Group A 

* – UVP Mirandola e Modena wins the Free-kick tie-up

Group B

Group C

Group D

Final stage

Championship

9th – 16th place

Final standing

References

External links

2013 Eurockey Cup
International roller hockey competitions hosted by Spain
2013 in Spanish sport